The Australian Labor Party (Western Australian Branch), commonly known as WA Labor, is the Western Australian branch of the Australian Labor Party. It is the current governing party of Western Australia since winning the 2017 election under Mark McGowan.

History
The Western Australian state division of the Australian Labor Party was formed at a Trade Union Congress in Coolgardie in 1899. Shortly afterwards the federal Labor Party was formalised in time for Australian federation in 1901. The WA Labor Party achieved representation in the Western Australian Parliament in 1900 with six members, and four years later the party entered into minority government with Henry Daglish becoming the first Labor Premier of Western Australia.

Leadership
The current leaders of the party are:
 Parliamentary Leader: Mark McGowan (Premier)
 State President: Lorna Clarke
 State Secretary: Ellie Whiteaker
 Assistant State Secretary: Lauren Cayoun
 State Treasurer: Naomi McLean

Election results for Legislative Assembly

References

Western Australia
Political parties in Western Australia